Potamogeton maackianus is an aquatic plant species in the genus Potamogeton. It is found in slow moving fresh water.

Distribution and habitat 
This is a common plant in lakes and ponds. It is known from Asian fresh waters of Russian Far East, Korea, Japan, China, Taiwan, Indonesia, Philippines, and Myanmar. (India was included in Fl. Malesiana, but the original literature has not found).

Description
Aquatic herb.

References

maackianus
Freshwater plants
Flora of Myanmar
Flora of China
Flora of Sumatra
Flora of Japan
Flora of Korea
Flora of the Philippines
Flora of Russia
Flora of Taiwan